The 2015 Navarrese regional election was held on Sunday, 24 May 2015, to elect the 9th Parliament of the Chartered Community of Navarre. All 50 seats in the Parliament were up for election. The election was held simultaneously with regional elections in twelve other autonomous communities and local elections all throughout Spain.

Regional president Yolanda Barcina, who had only came to power in 2011 after the establishment of a coalition government between the Navarrese People's Union (UPN) and the Socialist Party of Navarre (PSN–PSOE)—which proved to be short-lived, as Barcina herself expelled the PSN from the cabinet in 2012 over disagreements with then-PSN leader Roberto Jiménez—announced on 10 November 2014 that she would not seek re-election for a second term in office. This came after a legislature that proved to become the most unstable since the Spanish transition to democracy, with Barcina's minority government being unable to pass any budget following 2012, with one failed motion of no confidence in 2013 and the scare of a new one in 2014 over a number of corruption scandals besieging UPN.

After a spell of 19 years in power since 1996, the election saw UPN's support plummet to a low in popular support unseen since 1987, whereas the PSN scored its worst result in history. Both parties, together with the support obtained by the then-ruling party in Spain, the People's Party (PP), commanded just 24 seats, two short of a majority, allowing an alliance of Geroa Bai (GBai), EH Bildu and Izquierda-Ezkerra (I–E) with external support from Podemos to access the regional government and have GBai's Uxue Barkos elected as new president.

Overview

Electoral system
The Parliament of Navarre was the devolved, unicameral legislature of the Chartered Community of Navarre, having legislative power in regional matters as defined by the Spanish Constitution and the Reintegration and Enhancement of the Foral Regime of Navarre Law, as well as the ability to vote confidence in or withdraw it from a regional president.

Voting was on the basis of universal suffrage, which comprised all nationals over 18 years of age, registered in Navarre and in full enjoyment of their political rights. Additionally, Navarrese people abroad were required to apply for voting before being permitted to vote, a system known as "begged" or expat vote. The 50 members of the Parliament of Navarre were elected using the D'Hondt method and a closed list proportional representation, with a threshold of three percent of valid votes—which included blank ballots—being applied regionally. Parties not reaching the threshold were not taken into consideration for seat distribution.

Election date
The term of the Parliament of Navarre expired four years after the date of its previous election, unless it was dissolved earlier. The election decree was required to be issued no later than the twenty-fifth day prior to the date of expiry of parliament and published on the following day in the Official Gazette of Navarre (BON), with election day taking place on the fifty-fourth day from publication. The previous election was held on 22 May 2011, which meant that the legislature's term would have expired on 22 May 2015. The election decree was required to be published no later than 28 April 2015, with the election taking place on the fifty-fourth day from publication, setting the latest possible election date for the Parliament on Sunday, 21 June 2015.

The president had the prerogative to dissolve the Parliament of Navarre and call a snap election, provided that no motion of no confidence was in process, no nationwide election was due and some time requirements were met: namely, that dissolution did not occur either during the first legislative session or within the legislature's last year ahead of its scheduled expiry, nor before one year had elapsed since a previous dissolution under this procedure. In the event of an investiture process failing to elect a regional president within a three-month period from the election date, the Parliament was to be automatically dissolved and a fresh election called.

Background
The 2011 regional election had resulted in a coalition agreement between Navarrese People's Union (UPN) and the Socialist Party of Navarre (PSN), with UPN leader Yolanda Barcina being elected as President. However, tension remained frequent between both coalition partners, and in June 2012, PSN-PSOE leader and then-Vice President of Navarre Roberto Jiménez' questioning of a UPN's decision to pass an additional budget cut of 132 billion euros resulted in his expulsion from Barcina's Cabinet. The PSOE withdrew from the regional government, leaving UPN in minority. As a consequence, with the left-wing opposition commanding a majority in Parliament, political instability marked the remainder of the legislature, with the government being unable to pass its bills into law or to successfully approve further budgets.

The eruption of the Caja Navarra scandal in early 2013, involving President Barcina and other UPN high-ranking members, resulted in an ill-fated attempt by Bildu and Aralar / Nafarroa Bai to bring forward a censure motion against Yolanda Barcina, which had no realistic prospect of succeeding because of PSN abstention. Additionally, dissent within Barcina's party materialized with party Vice President Alberto Catalán forcing a leadership election in March 2013 which Barcina was only narrowly able to win. In February 2014, Finance Counselor Lourdes Goicoechea was accused of influence peddling within the regional Treasury, prompting Roberto Jiménez to threaten Barcina with a censure motion if she did not voluntarily call for a snap regional election. The PSOE national leadership, however, explicitly forbid its regional branch from reaching any kind of agreement that needed Bildu's support, and Jiménez backed down on his threat as a consequence.

The PSN-PSOE was severely mauled in the same year European Parliament election, winning just 14.5% compared to the 31.5% it had won in 2009, and losing over half of its 2009 votes (31,629 compared to 63,848 in 2009). Roberto Jiménez resigned as PSN leader, being succeeded by María Chivite. The abertzale left represented under EH Bildu's flag, on the other hand, became the second political force of the community for the first time ever, with 20.2% of the vote.

Podemos' emergence in opinion polls marked the end of the legislature and into 2015. Yolanda Barcina, initially widely scheduled to stand for re-election, announced on 10 November 2014 that she would not stand for a second term as President of Navarre. A primary election was held on 29 November 2014, in which incumbent Local Government minister Javier Esparza defeated Alberto Catalán and became UPN candidate for the 2015 regional election.

Parliamentary composition
The Parliament of Navarre was officially dissolved on 31 March 2015, after the publication of the dissolution decree in the Official Gazette of Navarre. The table below shows the composition of the parliamentary groups in the Parliament at the time of dissolution.

Parties and candidates
The electoral law allowed for parties and federations registered in the interior ministry, coalitions and groupings of electors to present lists of candidates. Parties and federations intending to form a coalition ahead of an election were required to inform the relevant Electoral Commission within ten days of the election call, whereas groupings of electors needed to secure the signature of at least one percent of the electorate in Navarre, disallowing electors from signing for more than one list of candidates.

Below is a list of the main parties and electoral alliances which contested the election:

Opinion polls
The tables below list opinion polling results in reverse chronological order, showing the most recent first and using the dates when the survey fieldwork was done, as opposed to the date of publication. Where the fieldwork dates are unknown, the date of publication is given instead. The highest percentage figure in each polling survey is displayed with its background shaded in the leading party's colour. If a tie ensues, this is applied to the figures with the highest percentages. The "Lead" column on the right shows the percentage-point difference between the parties with the highest percentages in a poll.

Voting intention estimates
The table below lists weighted voting intention estimates. Refusals are generally excluded from the party vote percentages, while question wording and the treatment of "don't know" responses and those not intending to vote may vary between polling organisations. When available, seat projections determined by the polling organisations are displayed below (or in place of) the percentages in a smaller font; 26 seats were required for an absolute majority in the Parliament of Navarre.

Voting preferences
The table below lists raw, unweighted voting preferences.

Victory preferences
The table below lists opinion polling on the victory preferences for each party in the event of a regional election taking place.

Victory likelihood
The table below lists opinion polling on the perceived likelihood of victory for each party in the event of a regional election taking place.

Preferred President
The table below lists opinion polling on leader preferences to become president of the Government of Navarre.

Results

Aftermath

Investiture processes to elect the president of the Government of Navarre required for an absolute majority—more than half the votes cast—to be obtained in the first ballot. If unsuccessful, a new ballot would be held 24 hours later requiring only of a simple majority—more affirmative than negative votes—to succeed. If such majorities were not achieved, successive candidate proposals would be processed under the same procedure. In the event of the investiture process failing to elect a regional president within a three-month period from the election date, the Parliament would be automatically dissolved and a snap election called.

Notes

References
Opinion poll sources

Other

2015 in Navarre
Navarre
Regional elections in Navarre
May 2015 events in Spain